Terence Cole or Terry Cole may refer to:

Terence Cole (cricketer) (1877–1944), cricketer 
Terence Cole (jurist) (born 1937), Australian jurist
Terry Cole (stuntman), British TV and film stuntman
Terry Cole-Whittaker, minister who founded an independent New Thought church in San Diego, California
Terry Cole (American football), retired American football player
 Terry Cole, chief technologist at the Jet Propulsion Laboratory and senior faculty associate in the Caltech Division of Chemistry and Chemical Engineering. Minor planet 6447 Terrycole is named after him.